Angadenia is a genus of plants in the family Apocynaceae first described as a genus in 1878. It is native to Florida and the West Indies.

Species
 Angadenia berteroi (A.DC.) Miers - Florida, Bahamas, Cuba, Hispaniola, Turks & Caicos Islands 
 Angadenia lindeniana (Müll.Arg.) Miers - Cuba, Hispaniola, Jamaica

formerly included

References

Echiteae
Apocynaceae genera